The Reingrabener Schiefer (other names Reingraben Shales, „Halobienschiefer“) is a lithostratigraphic unit, often described as independent geologic formation, or as a member of Lunz Formation. Reingraben shales are represented by black-brown or black, hard clayey shales and marly shales. Often contains spherosiderite nodules.

Occurs in Alps and Carpathians. It preserves fossils dating back to the Triassic period.

See also 

 List of fossiliferous stratigraphic units in Austria

References

External links 
 

Geologic formations of Austria
Triassic System of Europe
Triassic Austria
Shale formations